Ula is an offshore oil field located in the southern Norwegian section of North Sea along with Gyda, Tambar and Tambar East fields making up the UGT area, usually attributed to DONG Energy's main areas of exploration and production activity.

The Ula field was discovered in 1976 and came online in October 1986. It contains confirmed 69.98 million m3 of oil and 2.5 million of NGL.

Ownership
AkerBP is the operator of the field with 80% of interest in the project. AkerBP's partner DONG Energy holds 20% of interest. DONG Energy increased its initial share of 5% to 20% by acquiring Svenska Petroleum's complete share of 15% for US$130 million in 2008.

Production
The field has three conventional steel facilities with production, drilling, living quarters. It has 7 production and 2 water injection wells. Current production at Ula field is 10,000 bbl/d. The existing gas process plant was recently extended with a new module, turbine and compressor and has been operative since 2008. The gas from Blane field is injected into the Ula reservoir for production. The gas produced at Ula field is re-injected into the field for increased recovery as well. The field is expected to be abandoned in 2028. The produced oil is then transported by a pipeline to Ekofisk oil field and on to Teesside for refining. In 2009, Aker Solutions was awarded a contract to tieback Ula field to Oselvar field. The work is expected to commence in 2011.

See also

Norpipe
North Sea oil
Economy of Norway

References

External links
 AkerBP official website

BP oil and gas fields
Energy in Norway
Former Ørsted (company) oil and gas fields
North Sea oil fields
Oil fields in Norway